Best Of is a compilation album by power metal band Stratovarius, released on 6 May 2016. It has 28 different Stratovarius songs spanning the band's entire career, hand-picked and remastered by the band. It also includes one new track, Until the End of Days. The album is split into two CDs, the limited edition also containing a third CD with songs from the Wacken 2015 live performance.

Track listing

Personnel
Timo Kotipelto – vocals
Matias Kupiainen – guitar, production
Jens Johansson – keyboard
Rolf Pilve – drums
Lauri Porra – bass

References

Stratovarius compilation albums
Edel Music albums
2016 compilation albums